Mother Goose in Hieroglyphics is a book for children by E.F. Bleiler, originally published in 1849.  The book features well-known nursery rhymes, written with pictures (about 400 detailed woodcuts) substituting certain words (rebus).

External links
 Facsimile, the Internet Archive.

Collections of nursery rhymes
1849 books